On 24 December 2019, a large group of militants on motorcycles attacked civilians and a military base in Arbinda, Soum Province, Burkina Faso. The attack and subsequent battle lasted several hours, resulting in the deaths of 35 civilians, 7 soldiers and 80 attackers. The attack was one of Burkina Faso's deadliest. A 48-hour state of mourning was declared after the attack.

Attack 
The militants first attacked a military outpost in northern Soum Province near Arbinda, killing 7 soldiers. The attack was eventually repelled by security forces. Around 80 attackers were killed during the clashes.

At the same time, dozens of attackers on motorcycles stormed into Arbinda, killing 35 civilians. The attackers supposedly targeted women, as 31 of the dead civilians were female. The battle and attacks lasted several hours, until the militants were pushed back by the Burkina Faso Army with the help of its air force.

References

2019 mass shootings in Africa
2019 murders in Burkina Faso
Attacks on military installations in the 2010s
December 2019 crimes in Africa
Mass murder in 2019
Massacres in Burkina Faso
Soum Province
Terrorist incidents in Burkina Faso in 2019
Jihadist insurgency in Burkina Faso